Julien Louis Brulé (30 April 1875 – after 1920) was a French archer who competed in the 1920 Summer Olympics. In 1920 he won five Olympic medals, gold and silver in individual events and two silver and one bronze in team competitions.

References

1875 births
Year of death missing
French male archers
Olympic archers of France
Archers at the 1920 Summer Olympics
Olympic gold medalists for France
Olympic silver medalists for France
Olympic bronze medalists for France
Olympic medalists in archery
Medalists at the 1920 Summer Olympics